Ajeya Pratap Singh (born 1956), formerly known as Ajeya Singh, is an Indian politician, a member of the Indian National Congress, and the 42nd Raja Bahadur king of Manda.

Political career
He was a president of the Jan Morcha party which was later on merged with Indian National Congress in June 2009 but left active politics in 2012.

Personal life
He is the eldest son of the seventh Prime Minister of India V. P. Singh. He is married to Shruti Kumari with whom he has two daughters.

Sources 

 Manda estate
 Jan Morcha merger with Congress party
 Ajeya Singh- Journey from Investment Banker & Businessman to Politics

References

1956 births
Indian National Congress politicians
Living people
Children of prime ministers of India
Lok Janshakti Party politicians